Hanley is one of the six towns that, along with Burslem, Longton, Fenton, Tunstall and Stoke-upon-Trent, amalgamated to form the City of Stoke-on-Trent in Staffordshire, England.

Hanley is the de facto city centre, having long been the commercial hub of Stoke-on-Trent. It is home to the Potteries Shopping Centre and many high street chain stores.

History

Etymology
The name Hanley comes from either "haer lea", meaning "high meadow", or "heah lea" meaning "rock meadow".

Municipal origins

Hanley was incorporated as a municipal borough in 1857 and became a county borough with the passage of the Local Government Act 1888. It was based at Hanley Town Hall. In 1910, along with Burslem, Tunstall, Fenton, Longton and Stoke-upon-Trent it was federated into the county borough of Stoke-on-Trent. Hanley was the only one of the six towns to be a county borough before the merger; its status was transferred to the enlarged borough. In 1925, following the granting of city status, it became one of the six towns that constitute the City of Stoke-on-Trent.

Coal mining
At one time, there were many coal mines in North Staffordshire. Hanley Deep Pit was opened in 1854. It was the deepest pit in the North Staffordshire coalfield, reaching a depth of 1500 feet. At its peak in the 1930s it employed some 2,000 men and boys often producing  of coal a week. The pit was closed in 1962 but much of the headgear and spoilheaps were left in situ. Then, in the 1980s, the original site was cleared, landscaped and converted into Central Forest Park. Coal miners in the Hanley and Longton area ignited the 1842 General Strike and associated Pottery Riots. The College Road drill hall was completed in 1903.

Garden Festival
The 1986 Stoke-on-Trent Garden Festival led to the reclamation of large areas of land west of the city centre area – including the former Shelton steelworks, which had been derelict since 1978. When the Garden Festival closed, the land remained derelict for some time, before being re-developed partly into public parkland and partly for retail and leisure.

Public transport
In 2013, a new bus station opened in Hanley. This replaced the former bus station, on Lichfield Street. The new bus station was the first stage in the regeneration project which will see the previous bus station demolished, and replaced with a new centre consisting of shops, restaurants and a cinema. The new bus station is smaller than its predecessor, and has seen various routes in and out of the city changed to accommodate its location. The bus station features a sheltered waiting area, Spar shop, cafe and toilets, is covered by CCTV, and has digital timetables showing information on travel times for the day, as well as Now/Next above the entrance to each bay. Access to the station is controlled by automatic doors, at both the pedestrian entrance and coach bays.

The new bus station links Hanley with towns in North Staffordshire, as well as Buxton, Crewe, Shrewsbury, and Stafford. Most services are run by First Potteries, though there are a number of smaller independent operators, such as D&G Bus, and Arriva Midlands. In addition, National Express Coaches connect Hanley with destinations including London, Birmingham, Liverpool and Manchester, with additional seasonal services to holiday destinations. As part of the redevelopment of the town and wider city, a new bus interchange was opened on John Street in March 2013, allowing the current station to be demolished to make room for further redevelopment of the town.

Hanley no longer has a railway station but there was once one located on Trinity Street, on the Potteries Loop Line, which was opened by the North Staffordshire Railway for passengers on 13 July 1864. The station survived for 100 years – it was closed in 1964, as part of the Beeching Axe, and the land is now a car park.  The nearest railway station is Stoke-on-Trent.

Hanley is connected to the waterways network; it meets the Trent and Mersey Canal at Festival Park, it is also connected to the east of the country via the Cauldon Canal.

Cultural sites

Hanley has several cultural facilities such as the Potteries Museum & Art Gallery (a large ceramics collection, and restored Spitfire), the Victoria Hall, the Regent Theatre, BBC Radio Stoke's Open Centre and studios, while Piccadilly hosts the annual Sanity Fair and French Market events. Hanley is also the location of Stoke Pride, an annual pride event for LGBT people of the city.

Religion

Christian churches and chapels in Hanley include:
 Bethel Evangelical Free Church (Newhall Street),
 Bethesda Town Mission (Jasper Street),
 Church of Jesus Christ of Latter-day Saints (Cardiff Grove),
 Church of Scientology (Warner Street),
 Congregational Independent Tabernacle Church (High Street),
 Elim Church (Bucknall Old Road, corner of Mynors Street, Northwood),
 Etruria Wesleyan Chapel (Etruria Old Road, Etruria),
 Holy Trinity C of E (Lower Mayer Street, Northwood),
 Providence Methodist Church (Junction of Town Road, and Hulton Street),
 St. John's C of E (Town Road, Hanley),
 St. Luke's C of E (Wellington Terrace),
 St. Mark's C of E (Broad Street, Shelton),
 St. Matthew's C of E (Birches Head),
 Sacred Heart RC (Jasper Street), Trinity Methodist (Keelings Road, Northwood), and
 St Simon and St Jude (Seaford Street, College Road (was Victoria Road), Shelton).

Notable people

 Joseph Glass (fl.1670-1701 at least), potter, worked in slipware
 Henry Heath (1828–1908) was a Latter-day Saint (Mormon) pioneer, explorer, settler and lawman in the frontier Utah Territory.
 Thomas Twyford (1849–1921) pottery maker, invented the single piece, ceramic flush toilet
 Sarah Benett (1850-1924), Suffragette, member of WSPU, social reformer worked in Hanley
 Edward Smith (1850–1912) Merchant Navy officer, captain of the RMS Titanic, who went down with the ship.
 Sir Albert Edward Bowen, 1st Baronet (1858–1924) businessman, spent time in Argentina.
 Arnold Bennett (1867–1931) writer and novelist, but he also worked in the theatre, journalism, propaganda and films.
 John Gilbert Dale (1869–1926) scientist and prominent trade union and political activist.
 Eleanor Lodge (1869–1936) a British academic and sister of Oliver, Richard & Alfred Lodge
 Mabel Mary Spanton (1874–1940) landscape painter, worked in watercolour.
 Hilda Ormsby (1877–1973) a British academic and geographer.
 Frederick Hurten Rhead (1880–1942) ceramicist, figure in the Arts and Crafts movement.
 Raymond Coxon (1896–1997) artist, had retrospective exhibition at the Potteries Museum & Art Gallery in 1987.
 George Henry Evans Hopkins  (1898–1973) entomologist
 Hanley Stafford (born Alfred John Austin, 1899–1968), an actor principally on radio.
 Goddard Lieberson (1911–1977) president of Columbia Records 1956-1971 & 1973-1975
 Henry Joseph Gallagher  (1914 – 1988) was awarded the Distinguished Conduct Medal for his gallantry during the Korean War.
 James Bostock (1917–2006) a painter, printmaker and wood engraver
 John Forrester (1924–2007) Labour Party politician, MP for Stoke North 1966–1987.
 Harold Perkin (1926–2004) social historian  and founder of the Social History Society (1976).
 Ken Whitmore (born 1937) a prolific author of radio and stage plays, short stories and poetry
 Jeff Kent (born 1951) academic, musician, author and historian.

Sport 
 Bill Rowley (1865–1939) footballer, 124 appearances for  Stoke City F.C. as goalkeeper.
 Horace Austerberry (1868–1946) football manager, managed Stoke City F.C. 1897–1908. 
 Alf Underwood (1869–1928) footballer, played 130 times for Stoke City F.C.
 Thomas Holford (1878–1964) footballer, 474 appearances for Stoke City F.C. Manchester City F.C.,  and Port Vale F.C.
 Arthur Box (1884–1960) footballer who played as a goalkeeper, over 100 appearances for Port Vale F.C., Stoke City F.C. and Birmingham City F.C. 
 Sir Stanley Matthews,  (1915–2000) footballer, one of the greatest players of the British game, 693 appearances for Stoke City F.C. and Blackpool F.C.
 Les West (born 1943) cyclist, dominant figure during the 1960 and 1970's
 Terry Alcock, (born 1946) former footballer, played 330 league games mainly for Port Vale F.C. and Blackpool F.C.

See also
Bethesda Methodist Chapel, Hanley
1842 Pottery Riots
Hanley Town F.C.

References

External links

Hanley – one of the Six Towns
The Potteries Museum & Art Gallery, Hanley
Use interactive maps to find historic photographs and objects of old Hanley
Town profile at The Sentinel (local newspaper)

Areas of Stoke-on-Trent
Towns in Staffordshire
Former civil parishes in Staffordshire